Schönkirchen-Reyersdorf is a town in the district of Gänserndorf in the Austrian state of Lower Austria.

Geography
Schönkirchen-Reyersdorf lies on the north edge of the Marchfeld in Lower Austria. Only about 2.31 percent of the municipality is forested.

References

Cities and towns in Gänserndorf District